Henry Randolph Storrs (September 3, 1787 – July 29, 1837) was a U.S. Representative from New York, brother of William Lucius Storrs.

Born in Middletown, Connecticut, Storrs was graduated from Yale College in 1804.
He studied law.
He was admitted to the bar in 1807 and commenced practice in Champion, New York.
Later practiced in Whitesboro and Utica, New York.

Storrs was elected as a Federalist to the Fifteenth and Sixteenth Congresses (March 4, 1817 – March 4, 1821).
He was an unsuccessful candidate for renomination in 1820.

Storrs was elected as an Adams-Clay Federalist to the Eighteenth Congress, re-elected as an Adams candidate to the Nineteenth and Twentieth Congresses and elected as an Anti-Jacksonian to the Twenty-first Congress (March 4, 1823 – March 4, 1831).
He served as chairman of the Committee on Naval Affairs (Nineteenth Congress).
He was one of the managers appointed by the House of Representatives in 1830 to conduct the impeachment proceedings against James H. Peck, United States judge for the district of Missouri.

While Andrew Jackson attempted to break treaties with Indians in 1830, Storrs condemned Jackson's actions as a dangerous course, explaining "If the friends of State rights propose to sanction the violation of these Indian treaties, they must bear him out to the full extent of this thoughtless usurpation." Storrs adamantly pointed out how republicans could act like monarchies and oppress others, and that America would be confirming this truth by its own example.
Presiding judge of the court of common pleas of Oneida County 1825–1829.
He moved to New York City and practiced law.
He died in New Haven, Connecticut, July 29, 1837 and was interred in Grove Street Cemetery.

Sources

1787 births
1837 deaths
Yale College alumni
Burials at Grove Street Cemetery
Politicians from Utica, New York
New York (state) state court judges
New York (state) National Republicans
Federalist Party members of the United States House of Representatives from New York (state)
National Republican Party members of the United States House of Representatives
Politicians from Middletown, Connecticut
People from Champion, New York
19th-century American politicians
19th-century American judges